Stuart Greer (born December 2, 1959) is an American retired character actor.

Education
Greer began acting in stage productions while a student at the University of Arkansas at Little Rock before being accepted into the Professional Workshop at the Circle in the Square Theatre in New York City, where he studied from 1987 to 1989.

Career 
His first New York stage appearance was in the off-off Broadway production of "Mayberry's Revenge" at the Terry Schreiber Theater. After work in regional theater and years of jobs in warehouses and construction, he began acting in films and television at the age of thirty-four. His feature film credits include I Know What You Did Last Summer, The Reaping, The Mechanic, Runaway Jury and Forty Shades of Blue, among others. He appeared in the Millennium Films release Homefront, as Lewis, which opened in November 2013. In seasons 2 & 3 of the Sundance Original Series RECTIFY, he portrayed "Lid Comphrey". He also appeared in five episodes of season two of the AMC series, Turn: Washington's Spies, playing "Warden Officer Yates". Greer played Sheriff Bernie Watts in the 2015 film American Ultra. He portrayed "Roman" in the final two episodes of season six of The Walking Dead.

Personal life 
After suffering a stroke in October 2016, Greer retired from acting and relocated to Benton, Arkansas.

Filmography

Film

Television

External links

References 

1959 births
American male stage actors
American male film actors
American male television actors
Living people
University of Arkansas at Little Rock alumni
Circle in the Square Theatre School alumni
21st-century American male actors
20th-century American male actors